Coprinellus flocculosus is a species of agaric fungus in the family Psathyrellaceae. It was first described as Agaricus flocculosus by mycologist Augustin Pyramus de Candolle in 1815, and later transferred to the genus Coprinellus in 2001.

References

flocculosus
Fungi described in 1805